Mbasa Gqadushe (born 24 March 1986 in East London, Cape Province) is a South African cricketer who has played seventy seven first class matches for Kwa-Zulu Natal with 2040 runs and 15 wickets. He was included in the KZN Inland squad for the 2015 Africa T20 Cup.

In September 2018, he was named in Mpumalanga's squad for the 2018 Africa T20 Cup.

References

External links

1986 births
Living people
South African cricketers
KwaZulu-Natal cricketers
Mpumalanga cricketers
Cricketers from East London, Eastern Cape